This is a list of speakers of the Regional Representative Council, the upper house of Indonesia. This list includes preceding body, the speaker of the Senate of the United States of Indonesia.

Speaker of the Senate of the United States of Indonesia

Speakers of the Regional Representative Council

Bibliography

See also 

 List of Temporary Speakers and Deputy Speakers of the Regional Representative Council

References

Lists of legislative speakers
Lists of political office-holders in Indonesia